A tapestry lawn (also referred to as a grass-free lawn) is a lawn format that has no grass component. It uses a variety of different mowing tolerant perennial forb species in combination. The overall visual effect of the many species of plant grown together is referred to as a tapestry. 
The format is based on research carried out at the University of Reading. Developed with temperate humid oceanic climate in mind, it applies ecological principals and horticultural practices to address some of the ecological and environmental issues associated with traditional grass lawns.

Management
The lawn-defining and traditional practice of mowing is the key management tool in tapestry lawns. The need for its application is reduced by up to two thirds compared to traditional mowing regimes   because of the absence of grasses and the growth patterns of forbs. A consequence of this is that greater numbers of both plant and insect species are able to inhabit the lawn.

Mechanisms
In tapestry lawns, mowing not only operates to maintain a low lawn-like aesthetic, but it repeatedly modulates the light environment and intentionally creates physical stress. The relatively taller plant species used gradually take more and more of the light as they grow, creating internal shade within the lawn and stressing the lower growing plants. When mowing is applied it removes the tall growth. This allows light to reach the light starved low growing plants and stresses the tall plants by reducing their size and photosynthetic area. The tall plants stop growing and use reserves of carbohydrates to repair the damage. Once the damage has been repaired, they begin to regrow from a reduced size plant. The low growing plants take advantage of the post-mowing window of opportunity to access light. In this way both low growing prostrate plants and the somewhat taller plants can be grown together.

Biodiversity 
An increase in plant diversity and decrease in mowing can increase the overall diversity of a green space. Mowing can cause insect mortality in the process as well as reduce habitat. Reduced mowing regimes enabled by the tapestry lawn format offers protection and more abundant food resources for arthropods than a traditional grass lawn. The combination of multiple forb species extends the availability of pollen and nectar for pollinating insects. Access to blooms and long stems gives arthropods safe hiding places to hibernate. Growing a mix of native plant species in the tapestry lawn has been shown to increase insect abundance and diversity.

Plants

Suitable plant species for the tapestry lawn tend to have origins in NW Europe but can include species from other temperate regions:
Acaena inermis
Achillea millefolium
Ajuga reptans
Bellis perennis
Chamaemelum nobile
Glechoma hederacea
Leptinella dioica
Lobelia pedunculata
Lysimachia nummularia
Pilosella officinarum
Ranunculus repens
Trifolium repens
Veronica chamaedrys
Viola odorata

The primary component species of tapestry lawns all show the capacity for clonal reproduction. Other component species include those that are able to successfully set seed in a mown environment e.g. daisies (Bellis perennis). Non-clonal species and those that do not manage to set seed in a mown environment can also be used, although these may require replacement at the end of their natural lifespan.

Some of the plants used have a role in providing simple ground cover (Leptinella sp) and evergreen cover in winter (Ranunculus repens). Some species can be herbaceous and give autumn foliage colour (Argentina anserina); some produce flowers and extend the floral season from spring to autumn (Veronica chamaedrys, Parochetus communis). The use of cultivars brings foliage effects (Ajuga reptans ‘Burgundy Glow’), and allows for lawn gardening – where plants are added and subtracted according to requirements.
A wide variety of plant species is used, with a minimum of twelve different species and no upper limit, since environmentally unsuitable species will soon die out. When more species are used there is greater scope for aesthetic choices, extending floral period and resource opportunities for pollinating insects and less chance of any one species becoming dominant in the lawn.

Establishment
Tapestry lawns can be established using seeds or plugs from a mixture of native and non-native forb species. Starting with plugs gives the immature forbs a higher probability of establishment and decreases the competition with germinating grass seeds in the soil seed bank. Plants should be selected for their ability to spread through rhizomes, reproduce vegetatively, or have high rates of seed germination in order to cover bare soil and decrease maintenance and replanting. Plants can be arranged in a random pattern or with a purposeful design. A mixture of colors, heights, textures, and flowering times is used to maximize the aesthetic appeal of the lawn throughout the year.

See also
Moss lawn
Lawn
Ground cover

References

Lawns